The 1981 Preakness Stakes was the 106th running of the $275,000 Grade 1 Preakness Stakes thoroughbred horse race. The race took place on May 16, 1981, and was televised in the United States on the ABC television network. Pleasant Colony, who was jockeyed by Jorge Velásquez, won the race by one length over runner-up Bold Ego. Approximate post time was 5:41 p.m. Eastern Time. The race was run on a fast track in a final time of 1:54-3/5. The Maryland Jockey Club reported total attendance of 84,133, this is recorded as second highest on the list of American thoroughbred racing top attended events for North America in 1981.

Payout 

The 106th Preakness Stakes Payout Schedule

$2 Exacta:  (11–6) paid   $25.00

The full chart 

 Winning Breeder: Thomas Mellon Evans; (VA)
 Winning Time: 1:54 3/5
 Track Condition: Fast
 Total Attendance: 84,133

References

External links 

 

1981
1981 in horse racing
Horse races in Maryland
1981 in American sports
1981 in sports in Maryland
May 1981 sports events in the United States